Oro Loma (Spanish for "Hill Gold") is an unincorporated community in Fresno County, California.

A post office operated at Oro Loma from 1914 to 1929. A public elementary and middle school that operated in Oro Loma at 5609 Russell Avenue was finally closed in 2010; students from the area now attend schools in Dos Palos, California, as part of the Dos Palos Oro Loma Joint Unified School District.

References

Unincorporated communities in California
Unincorporated communities in Fresno County, California